Rojda Demirer  (born 12 August 1980) is a Turkish theater, movie, television, and voice actress of Kurdish origin.

Early years
She was born in Ankara to a father of origin from Diyarbakır. Her paternal family is of Kurdish origin, from the Raman tribe. Her cousin is the actress Belçim Bilgin. Her father died of cancer when Demirer was seven. She lived with her mother and older sister Ruken. Rojda is the Kurdish language word for "sunrise". However, she can't speak Kurdish.

At the age of 8, she began performing in children's programmes at the state-owned TRT's Radio Ankara. Between 1997–2001, Demirer studied drama at the Turkish State Conservatory of  Hacettepe University in Ankara. After graduation, she worked for the State Theater of Trabzon from 2003 to 2008.

Career
She received the İsmail Cem Television Award, the "Best Supporting Actress in a TV-series for Youth" in 2010 for her role in the Show TV youth drama series Melekler Korusun. The serial is at present being re-run by the Fox TV Turkey.

Lately, she opened an upmarket home-made chocolate store called "Marie-Antoinette Chocolate" in memory of the French Queen, in the Nişantaşı quarter of Istanbul together with her sister Ruken Demirer, who is also an actress.

Filmography

References

External links
 
 Rojda Demirer on SinemaTürk

1980 births
Living people
Turkish Muslims
Turkish Alevis
21st-century Turkish actresses
Turkish film actresses
Turkish television actresses
Turkish voice actresses
Actresses from Ankara
Turkish people of Kurdish descent
Hacettepe University Ankara State Conservatory alumni
Kurdish actresses